Justin Wall is a former U.S. soccer forward who attended Westmont College, a small school which played in the NAIA.  In his four seasons with the Warriors, Wall helped the team to the 1989 NAIA Final Four.  On an individual level, Wall was a three time All American and ended his career with the Warriors with 23 assists.

In 1992, Wall signed with the San Francisco Bay Blackhawks of the American Professional Soccer League.  However, he saw time in only four games for a total of 138 minutes.  In 1993, he became a regular on the team, now renamed the San Jose Hawks which now played in the U.S. Interregional Soccer League (USISL).  The Hawks took the Pacific Division title, making the Sizzling Six post-season tournament.  Wall was a Sizzling Six All Star that season.

He later joined the San Jose Clash front office, working ticket sales and promotions.

Westmont inducted Wall into its Athletic Hall of Fame in 2006.

External links
 Westmont Hall of Fame profile 

American soccer players
American Professional Soccer League players
San Francisco Bay Blackhawks players
USISL players
San Jose Hawks players
Westmont Warriors men's soccer players
Living people
Association football forwards
Year of birth missing (living people)